Nick Hatzke (born October 16, 1983 in San Jose, California, USA) is an American soccer player.

Starting off by playing soccer at Bellarmine College Preparatory he then played college soccer at the University of California, Berkeley, before being drafted in the first round (13th overall) of the 2007 MLS Supplemental Draft by Houston Dynamo.

Having spent time with Dynamo's reserves, Hatzke made his full professional debut for Dynamo on July 10, 2007, in a US Open Cup third-round game against Charleston Battery. He made his second first team appearance on July 1, 2008, again in a US Open Cup third-round game against Charleston Battery.

References

American soccer players
Houston Dynamo FC players
Orange County Blue Star players
USL League Two players
1983 births
Living people
California Golden Bears men's soccer players
Houston Dynamo FC draft picks
Soccer players from San Jose, California
Association football midfielders